Joanna Jesh Transport Corporation (JJT) is one of the largest city bus companies in the Philippines. It plies routes from Food Terminal Incorporates (FTI Complex) in Taguig to Navotas.

Etymology

Joanna Jesh Transport was taken from the names Joanna and Jessa. The eldest was said to be named Joanna Marie de Guzman Mahilac, while the second one was Jessa de Guzman Mahilac. These were the daughters of Crisinciano E. Mahilac, sole founder and owner of the company.

History

Founded in 2003 by Crisinciano E.  Mahilac, a former Overseas Filipino Worker (OFW) in Saudi Arabia (where the trademark KSA is found inside the bus units), the company started to operate 8 Japayuki buses and 2 ordinary buses for FTI-Navotas route. But the company decided to change these units into all ordinary buses when the company bought two ordinary Daewoo buses, and later, 14 UD Nissan Diesel and 4 Hino ordinary units (in addition with its only one Japayuki unit, which was converted into ordinary). There were additional 10 bus units (UD Nissan Diesel and Hino) which were named as Amtrak Transport Inc. (but the name changed after the serious road accident), plying Baclaran-Navotas route.

Issues and criticisms

A serious accident involving Joanna Jesh Transport and Commuters Bus Corp. shocked the commuters and some stand-by people waiting inside the loading/unloading bay at EDSA-Santolan northbound lane. On October 21, 2008, two Joanna Jesh bus units (with one named Amtrak Transport) with plate numbers TYG-660 and TYF-868 respectively were racing each other when a Commuters Bus Corp. unit (TXE-812) which was at their front stopped outside the loading/unloading bay under the MRT Santolan station to unload the passengers. This resulted to a collision of the first Joanna Jesh bus to the Mercedes Benz sedan car, killing Dr. Francisco Sarabia, an eye specialist, and injuring four other people (including the conductors Salvador de Guzman and Laurentino Bedino), which resulted in burning of the car. The driver, Martinito Madrid, was arrested, together with two other drivers (one from Commuters) by the Quezon City Police District (QCPD) and were placed under the custody of the police. Madrid was charged with reckless driving resulting in homicide, but he was set free temporarily after paying a bail for his offense.

The Land Transportation Franchising and Regulatory Board (LTFRB) lifted a thirty-day suspension against Joanna Jesh Transport and Commuters Bus Corp. and the operation of the bus units of both companies were grounded. However, the suspension against them were considered "premature". The bus drivers of the mentioned companies were given a three-day training at National Center of Transportation Studies in University of the Philippines(UP) in Diliman. They were put under drug testing as a prerequisite to normal operations of the company.

According to Atty. Omar Mayo, lawyer of the bus company, he claimed that Joanna Jesh Transport did not violate any franchise laws. Mayo disputed and questioned the suspension and the so-called "use of illegal and unauthorized business name" as a sanction against the company. This evidence was supported by QCPD Traffic Sector Police Officer 2 Renato Sunga. According to Sunga, as based on the investigation, the Commuters Bus unit was responsible for the traffic violation because the driver stopped the bus outside the loading/unloading bay to load/unload the passengers.

Last November 10, 2008, a few days before the end of the preventive suspension against Joanna Jesh, LTFRB decided to lift up the suspension after the retraining of the bus drivers and due to the petition of the company to curb out the suspension. But still, according to Manny Mahipus, LTFRB executive director, the company faced administrative charges if the family of the victims will file civil or criminal charges against the company.

Despite of the lifting of the suspension, there were rumors that some bus drivers of the company are overtaking their buses just to have their earnings on everyday work until the present day.

It was reported on May 3, 2015 that an AJ Sampaguita Bus Liner, also operating under the same company was caught driving recklessly on the elevated Skyway. Buses on the elevated Skyway are only allowed to drive at 80 km/h due to the dangers a large vehicle could cause. The said bus was traveling at a speed of over 120 km/h while recklessly overtaking cars and swerving in and out of lanes. A motorist attempted to warn the bus to slow down, the driver misunderstood this as an act of aggression and cut off the vehicle while even threatening to collide with him. The driver was later seen giggling on the wheel of the bus which was also filled with passengers.

On February 1, 2016, a Joanna Jesh bus driven by Roel Labin swerved to the left and then rammed the orange barriers of the MMDA while racing against another bus in EDSA-Ayala Southbound. It was caught in video from a dashboard camera.

Recently, on the issue of campaign against illegal drugs, the operator and incumbent mayor of Sinacaban, Misamis Occidental, Crisinciano Enot Mahilac, was included in the list of the narco-politicians which he was strongly linked to the Parohinog clan who were suspected drug lords in the province. President Rodrigo Duterte issued a warning to both political clans who were linked to illegal drug trade. Mahilac, who served mayor of the said municipality in three terms, might face sanction if he continued the illegal drug activity.

Recent updates

Last year, the company adopted a red violet livery of UD Nissan Diesel EXFOH units, with a total of 10 new buses, to address the problem of shortage of buses bound to FTI Complex. But still, the problem is only temporary for there were some former bus companies that were already defunct or phased out, like PVP Liner and King of Kings Transport (owned by Claire dela Fuente).

Recently, Joanna Jesh Transport has formed a new bus company with Nissan Diesel Santarosa Euro buses (Metrorider) units. Later, it was renamed Yohance Express Inc., which is derive from the name of Cian Yohan Mahilac, the youngest son of Crisinciano Mahilac. The company also added UD Trucks Santarosa PKB units for Sampaguita Auto Transport Corp. and RBM Grand Rally Transport Inc. (both operated by: Yohance Express  Inc.) for their new route Pacita Complex, San Pedro, Laguna-Novaliches via EDSA NLEX Malinta Exit and NAIA-Grotto via EDSA Fairview Commonwealth Avenue, respectively.

In June 2017, Andi Mack Transport has formed a new tourist bus company with Volvo B7R-bodied Guilin Daewoo GL6127HKC1 with over 30 units (49-seater, 61-passenger capacity) and a Golden Dragon XML6122 with over 70 units (53-seater, 62-passenger capacity) featuring Isuzu D-Max sponsorship livery. It is named after the Disney Channel's top-rated comedy-drama television series of the same name.

Fleet
Joanna Jesh Transport utilizes and maintains roughly a total of over 230 buses. Some of these are :

 Nissan Diesel 
 Hino 
 Volvo B7R
 Volvo B7RLE
 Daewoo BS106 
 Iveco CC150
 Daewoo BF106 PKB

Routes
 F.T.I - Navotas Terminal via EDSA vice Versa (special route: PITX-Monumento via EDSA Carousel to MRT 3 bus augmentation)
 Baclaran - Navotas Terminal via EDSA vice versa - formerly known as Amtrak Transport Inc., this route has been terminated due to shortage of buses bound to FTI

Subsidiaries

CEM Trans Services Inc.
 FTI - Tungko via EDSA - Commonwealth Avenue (ordinary)
 Alabang - Malanday via EDSA - McArthur Highway (air conditioned)
 NAIA/Baclaran/PITX - Malanday via EDSA - McArthur Highway (air conditioned)
 NAIA/Baclaran/PITX - Tungko via EDSA - Commonwealth Avenue (air conditioned)
 Alabang - Navotas Terminal via EDSA (air conditioned) - operated under BCB Transport, Inc.
 Alabang - SM Fairview via EDSA - Commonwealth Avenue

Yohance Express Inc.
 Alabang - Novaliches via EDSA - Mindanao Avenue (White, Green & Yellow livery only) (formerly Pascual Liner Inc.)
 FTI - Navotas Terminal via EDSA (operated By: First North Luzon Transit Inc., a subsidiary of Pangasinan Five Star and Joanna Jesh Transport Corp.)
 Pacita Complex, San Pedro, Laguna - Valenzuela Gateway Complex via EDSA - NLEX Malinta Exit (formerly Sampaguita Auto Transport Corp./RAMT Transit)

RBM Grand Rally Transport Inc. (operated by: Yohance Express Inc.)
 NAIA/Baclaran/PITX - Tungko via EDSA - Commonwealth Avenue

Mega Bus Lines Corp.
 Pasay
 Cubao, Quezon City
 Market! Market!, Taguig
 Eastwood Mall Libis, Quezon City
 SM City Fairview, Quezon City
 Alabang, Muntinlupa
 Bulan, Sorsogon
 Matnog, Sorsogon
 Naga City, Camarines Sur
 Masbate City, Masbate** Daraga, Albay
 Rawis, Catubig, Northern Samar
 Catbalogan, Western Samar
 Catarman, Eastern Samar
 Tacloban City, Leyte
 Ormoc City, Leyte
 Baybay, Leyte
 Bato, Leyte
 Sogod, Leyte
 Maasin, Southern Leyte
 Liloan, Southern Leyte
 San Ricardo, Southern Leyte
 Tagbilaran City, Bohol
 Siquijor, Siquijor

Leyte Biliran Star Bus Corporation (operated by: PP Bus Lines)
 Pasay
 Cubao, Quezon City
 Market! Market!, Taguig
 Eastwood Mall Libis, Quezon City
 Alabang, Muntinlupa
 Rawis, Catubig, Northern Samar
 Catbalogan, Western Samar
 Catarman, Eastern Samar
 Tacloban City, Leyte
 Ormoc City, Leyte
 Baybay, Leyte
 Bato, Leyte
 Sogod, Leyte
 Maasin, Southern Leyte
 Liloan, Southern Leyte
 San Ricardo, Southern Leyte
 Biliran, Biliran Leyte
 Naval, Biliran Leyte
 Butuan Agusan del Norte
 Davao City Davao del Sur

References

Bus companies of the Philippines
Companies based in Taguig